Inspector George Gently (also known as George Gently for the pilot and first series) is a 2008 British television crime drama series produced by Company Pictures for BBC One, set in the 1960s and loosely based on some of the Inspector Gently novels written by Alan Hunter. The series stars Martin Shaw as the eponymous inspector and Lee Ingleby as Detective Sergeant John Bacchus, with Simon Hubbard and Lisa McGrillis in supporting roles as police constables in the fictitious North East Constabulary.

The series moved the setting of the stories to North East England, centring on Newcastle upon Tyne, Northumberland, and County Durham, as opposed to the Norfolk setting in the books. The death penalty is still in effect in Britain as the series begins, and it is used as a plot feature in some early episodes. The abolition of the death penalty in 1965 is noted in the series. The earliest episodes are set in 1964 with the eighth series taking place in 1970.

After fair ratings for the first three series, the BBC secured funding from the North East Content Fund to produce further episodes. The fourth series was filmed between January and June 2011, and was broadcast that autumn. On 26 March 2012, the BBC announced that four new feature-length episodes were being produced to be shown later the same year. The fifth series ended on a dramatic cliffhanger, with the fate of both leading characters uncertain. However, in September 2012, the lead writer, Peter Flannery, confirmed that a sixth series, consisting of four episodes, had been commissioned. The sixth series was shown in February 2014. A seventh series of four episodes was subsequently commissioned, and began being broadcast in April 2015. The eighth and final series was broadcast in 2017.

Cast
Martin Shaw as Chief Inspector George Gently
Lee Ingleby as Sergeant, later Detective Inspector John Bacchus
Simon Hubbard as PC Taylor
Lisa McGrillis as WPC, later Sergeant Rachel Coles (Series 6–8)
Tom Hutch as PC Tom Reynolds (Series 4–8)
Helen Coverdale as WPC 630 (Series 4–7)
Seán McGinley as China (Pilot)
Tony Rohr as China (Series 1–4)
Melanie Clark Pullen as Lisa Bacchus (Series 2–6)
Katie Anderson as Leigh Ann Bacchus (Series 5–6)
Annabel Scholey as Gemma Nunn (Series 7)

Series overview

Episode list

Pilot (2007)

Series 1 (2008)

Series 2 (2009)
The show's title is changed to 'Inspector' George Gently.

Series 3 (2010)

Series 4 (2011)
The show's theme song and opening credits sequence no longer appear starting with this series.

Series 5 (2012)

Series 6 (2014)

Series 7 (2015)

Series 8 (2017)
Filming for the eighth series began in January 2017. It was subsequently confirmed that this would be the final series, and it would comprise two feature-length episodes, set in 1970, written as a way to "close" the series. Company Pictures CEO Michele Buck commented: "We felt the character was coming to a natural end, and wanted to bring the audience an ambitious and exciting conclusion to such a well-loved show." Episode Two was originally set to air on 28 May 2017, but was postponed due to its proximity to the general election in the UK, given that the storyline – not confirmed at the time – dealt with a controversial politician.

DVD
Region 2 George Gently: Series 1 DVD Released 25 May 2009, EAN: 5036193096297 PAL Format Region 0 in the UK, distributed by Acorn Media UK.
Region 2 Inspector George Gently: Series 2 DVD Released 24 May 2010, EAN: 5036193097874 PAL Format Region 0 in the UK, distributed by Acorn Media UK.
Region 2 Inspector George Gently: Complete Series 1 & 2 DVD Released 4 October 2010, EAN: 5036193099915 PAL Format Region 0 in the UK, distributed by Acorn Media UK.
Region 2 Inspector George Gently: Complete Series 1–6 DVD Released 4 August 2014, PAL Format Region 0 in the UK, distributed by Acorn Media UK.
Region 2 George Gently – Der Unbestechliche, Volume 1 DVD Released 19 June 2009, EAN: 4029758960882 PAL Format in Germany, distributed by edel distribution.
Region 2 George Gently – Der Unbestechliche, Volume 2 DVD Released 20 May 2011, EAN: 4029759044284 PAL Format in Germany, distributed by edel distribution.
Region 2 George Gently – Der Unbestechliche, Volume 3 DVD Released 10 June 2011, EAN: 4029759067931 PAL Format in Germany, distributed by edel distribution.
Region 1 George Gently: Series 1 DVD Released 11 November 2008, ASIN: B001B43IUS NTSC Format in the US, distributed by Acorn Media US.
Region 1 George Gently: Series 2 DVD Released 25 May 2010, ASIN: B00331RHCM NTSC Format in the US, distributed by Acorn Media US.
Region 1 George Gently: Series 3 DVD Released 28 June 2011, ASIN: B004SI5VUY NTSC Format in the US, distributed by Acorn Media US.
Region 1 George Gently: Series 4 DVD Released 3 July 2012, ASIN: B007S0DEB2 NTSC Format in the US, distributed by Acorn Media US.
Region 1 George Gently: Series 5 DVD Released 28 May 2013, ASIN: B009DS3VQA NTSC Format in the US, distributed by Acorn Media US.
Region 1 George Gently: Series 6 DVD Released 1 April 2014, ASIN: B00GWXI1F0 NTSC Format in the US, distributed by Acorn Media US.
Region 1 George Gently: Series 7 DVD Released 29 September 2015, ASIN: B00XDBMB8W NTSC Format in the US, distributed by Acorn Media US.
Region 1 George Gently: Series 8 DVD Released 12 December 2017, ASIN: B074WTYF4G NTSC Format in the US, distributed by Acorn Media US.
Region 4 George Gently: Series 1 DVD Released 17 September 2009, EAN: 9397910797498 PAL Format in Australia, distributed by REEL DVD Australia.
Region 4 George Gently: Series 2 DVD Released 4 March 2010, EAN: 9397911012293 PAL Format in Australia, distributed by REEL DVD Australia.
Region 4 George Gently: Series 1 & 2 DVD Released 5 May 2011, EAN: 9397911120899 PAL Format in Australia, distributed by REEL DVD Australia.
Region 4 George Gently: Series 3 DVD Released 7 July 2011, EAN: 9397911102291 PAL Format in Australia, distributed by REEL DVD Australia.
Region 4 George Gently: Series 4 DVD Released 1 May 2013, EAN: 9397911234497 PAL Format in Australia, distributed by REEL DVD Australia.
Region 4 George Gently: Series 5 DVD Released 1 May 2013, EAN: 9397911246995 PAL Format in Australia, distributed by REEL DVD Australia.
Region 4 George Gently: Series 6 DVD Released 2014, PAL Format in Australia, distributed by REEL DVD Australia.
Region 4 George Gently: Series One to Six DVD Released 4 March 2015: EAN 9349055001107 PAL Format in Australia, distributed by REEL DVD Australia.
Region 4 George Gently: Series 7 DVD Released 8 October 2015: EAN  9349055001497 PAL Format In Australia, distributed by REEL DVD Australia.
Region 4 George Gently: Series One to Seven DVD Released 17 December 2015, EAN: 9349055003095 PAL Format In Australia, distributed by REEL DVD Australia.
Region 4 George Gently: Series 7 DVD Released 5 August 2017, EAN: 9349055001497 PAL Format in Australia, distributed by Madman Entertainment.
Region 4 George Gently: Series 8 DVD Released 13 December 2017, EAN: 9349055003538 PAL Format in Australia, distributed by Madman Entertainment.
Region 4 George Gently: Series One to Eight DVD Released 8 March 2018: EAN:  9349055003552 PAL FORMAT in Australia, distributed by Madman Entertainment.

References

External links

Inspector George Gently at the British Film Institute
George Gently press pack from the BBC Press Office, 2007
Radio Times Martin Shaw interview, February 2014

2007 British television series debuts
2017 British television series endings
2000s British crime television series
2010s British crime television series
2000s British drama television series
2010s British drama television series
2000s British mystery television series
2010s British mystery television series
BBC television dramas
Television shows based on British novels
Television series set in the 1960s
Television series by All3Media
Television shows set in Tyne and Wear
Television shows set in County Durham
British detective television series
English-language television shows